Yekaterinovka is a rural locality (a village) in Chertkovskoye Rural Settlement, Selivanovsky District, Vladimir Oblast, Russia. The population was 9 as of 2010.

Geography 
Yekaterinovka is located 9 km west from Chertkovo, 18 km northeast of Krasnaya Gorbatka (the district's administrative centre) by road. Chernovskaya is the nearest rural locality.

References 

Rural localities in Selivanovsky District